The 1980–81 season was Chelsea Football Club's sixty-seventh competitive season.

Table

References

External links
 1980–81 season at stamford-bridge.com

1980–81
English football clubs 1980–81 season